Bishop Payne Divinity School was a "racially" segregated Episcopal school for African-American ministerial students, in Petersburg, Virginia. It operated on Perry Street (1878–1886), West Washington Street (1886–1889), and finally South West Street (1889–1949). The school's Emmanuel Chapel still stands, at the corner of South West and Willcox Streets.

Facilities

The College began in 1878 when James Solomon Russell, who would be the school's first graduate and left us a description of his experiences there, was called to the ministry but was not allowed to study at the all-white Episcopal Virginia Theological Seminary (VTS) in Alexandria. To provide schooling for him, and other African-American students who "were not in any way prepared to enter either the Preparatory Department or the Theological Department of the Seminary", some of whom "had only the barest rudiments of common-school [primary school] education," a theology professor was added to a new (1866) school for freedmen, St. Stephen's Normal and Industrial School, in Petersburg, Virginia. The theology professor's salary ($600) was paid by VTS. The school became St. Stephen's Normal and Theological School. It was located on Perry Street, between Gill and Washington Streets. Russell was the only ministerial student for three years. By 1876, 20 students had enrolled.

It was chartered in 1884 by the state of Virginia as the Bishop Payne Divinity and Industrial School, in honor of John Payne, first Episcopal bishop of Liberia. (Payne's widow was the school matron.) "The title of the school was somewhat misleading as it implied an Industrial Department which the school did not have, and gave no hint of a Normal Department, which the school did have."

From 1886 to 1889, the school was based in a house and lot in the 1100 block of South Washington Street. In 1889, the school purchased eight lots on both sides of the street in the 400 block of South West Street, where it built Whittle Hall and Russell Hall on opposite sides of the street, remaining at that location until it closed.  In 1902 the Warden's residence was erected and in 1917 Emmanuel Chapel was added. In 1910 the name was changed again, to Bishop Payne Divinity School; the school was newly authorized by the state of Virginia to award the degree of Bachelor of Divinity.

Enrollment
Bishop Payne was the only Divinity School in the Episcopal Church devoted exclusively to the training of "young Negro men" for the ministry; as of 1921, there were 91 alumni, who constituted about 60% of the Episcopal Black clergy in the U.S. It was founded in 1878 as the St. Stephen's Episcopal Church Normal and Industrial School, and provided high school level instruction, as did most normal schools at the time.  In 1894 John W. Johnson, an 1890 graduate, became the first Black faculty member. In 1910 it gained the ability to award the Bachelor of Divinity degree and was renamed Bishop Payne Divinity School. Enrollment was low, only 12–15 at a time. In 1921 there were five professors, four of them white; as of that there were 81 alumni Until the 1940s all the trustees, photographed in an old film clip, were white; in 1947, seven of the seventeen trustees were Black.

Enrollment was negatively affected, to the point of threatening the Seminary's survival, by the decision of the church's Diocese of Virginia to deny a vote in the Diocesan Council to all newly ordained Negro clergymen. 

From 1905 to 1922 the president was Corbin Braxton Bryan, a white supremacist who believed whites had a responsibility to offer blacks the benefits  of Christianity.

The last graduation class of the school was in 1949. VirginiaTheological Seminary started admitting African-American students in 1951. At least 256 Black men and 6 Black women had attended (not all graduated).

On June 3, 1953, the school's assets and records were transferred to Virginia Theological Seminary, Alexandria, Virginia. The merger was negotiated by civil rights attorney Armistead Boothe. 

The library at Virginia Theological Seminary is named the Bishop Payne Library.

Alumni
 George Freeman Bragg
 James Solomon Russell

Notes

Educational institutions established in 1878
1878 establishments in Virginia
Seminaries and theological colleges in Virginia
Historically black Christian universities and colleges
Segregated schools
Teacher training
Buildings and structures in Petersburg, Virginia
Industrial schools
1953 disestablishments in Virginia
Educational institutions disestablished in 1953
Episcopal schools in Virginia
African-American Episcopalians